The Library House Ltd (Library House) was a business information and consulting company based in London, England, founded in 2002 by Doug Richard and John Snyder. 

Library House went into administration in December 2008, has had its database of deals sold to Dow Jones.

Library House discovered, compared and monitored private high-growth companies throughout Europe as they progressed through their lifecycle from initial investment to partnering, trade sale or public offering.  Clients of Library House included UK, US and European investors; including venture capital firms, private equity firms and business angels; professional service providers, such as financial advisers, executive search, accountancy and law firms, and corporations.

Library House's activities also included an increasingly successful events business (Essential Cleantech, Essential Mediatech, Meet the Companies, etc.) and Futurefest, a major event to be held in Cambridge in June 2009.

The company was associated with one of the world's largest business investment competitions which it ran annually in collaboration with the East of England Development Agency (EEDA) RunningTheGauntlet (now www.bizgrowtheast.com)

Free research reports
Library House produced free reports covering different areas of European venture-backed business.  Reports included:
 Cambridge Cluster Report 2008
 Mediatech 2008
 An Analysis of UK University Technology and Knowledge Transfer Activities

In the press
The company's research has been cited frequently in national and international press:
 18 September 2008 - The Guardian - The Guardian/Library House CleanTech 100
 22 August 2007 - The Financial Times -  UK Trails China for start-up venture capital
 14 March 2007 - The Financial Times -  Universities fare best with spin-out help
 13 March 2007 - The Daily Telegraph -  UK equals US spin-out success
 8 March 2007 - The Guardian - UK tech investments soar
 15 February 2007 - The Financial Times - UK tops European venture capital deals
 29 January 2007 - The New York Times - Europe Encouraging Clean Energy Industry

References

External links
 Doug Richard on FutureFest Video

Macroeconomics consulting firms
Consulting firms established in 2002
Companies disestablished in 2008
Companies based in Cambridge
2002 establishments in England